The RADECS association is a non-profit professional organization that promotes basic and applied research in the field of radiation and its effects on materials, components and systems. The acronym RADECS stands for "RADiations Effects on Components and Systems.

History 
The first “Radiation and its Effects on Components and Systems" (RADECS) conference was held in Montpellier, France in 1989 as a French national conference. In 1991, the members of the organizing committee expanded the scope of RADECS to become a European conference. Since then, the RADECS Conference and RADECS Workshop have run in alternate years.

The activities of the RADECS association are as follows:
 RADECS biannual European Conference
 Biannual Technical Workshop
 Promote research activities on radiation effects due to charged, un-charged particles and ionizing radiation
 Scientific publications or promotion of scientific publications
 Cooperation and exchange with other organizations (e.g. IEEE Nuclear and Plasma Sciences Society)

RADECS conferences 

The RADECS conference and workshops address technical issues related to radiation effects on devices, integrated circuits, sensors, and systems, as well as radiation hardening, testing, and environmental modeling methods.  Papers from the events are published in a biennial issue of the IEEE Transactions on Nuclear Science journal.

References

External links 

EASii IC – Company for RADECS website

International professional associations
Radiation Effects
Nuclear organizations
Radiation Effects
International organizations based in France
Professional associations based in France
Organizations based in Montpellier